The 1955–56 Soviet Cup was the sixth edition of the Soviet Cup ice hockey tournament. 46 teams participated in the tournament, which was won by CSK MO Moscow for the third consecutive season.

Tournament

First round

Second round

1/8 finals

Quarterfinals

Semifinals

Final 

(* Automatic victory because opponent did not participate.)

External links
 Season on hockeyarchives.info
 Season on hockeyarchives.ru

Cup
Soviet Cup (ice hockey) seasons